Segregation academies are private schools in the Southern United States that were founded in the mid-20th century by white parents to avoid having their children attend desegregated public schools. They were founded between 1954, when the U.S. Supreme Court ruled that segregated public schools were unconstitutional, and 1976, when the court ruled similarly about private schools.

While many of these schools still existmost with low percentages of minority students even todaythey may not legally discriminate against students or prospective students based on any considerations of religion, race or ethnicity that serve to exclude non-white students. The laws that permitted their racially-discriminatory operation, including government subsidies and tax exemption, were invalidated by U.S. Supreme Court decisions. After Runyon v. McCrary (1976), all of these private schools were forced to accept African-American students. As a result, segregation academies changed their admission policies, ceased operations, or merged with other private schools.

Most of these schools remain overwhelmingly white institutions, both because of their founding ethos and because tuition fees are a barrier to entry. In communities where many or most white students are sent to these private schools, the percentages of African-American students in tuition-free public schools are correspondingly elevated. For example, in Clarksdale, Mississippi, in 2010, 92% of the students at Lee Academy were white, while 92% of the students at Clarksdale High School were black. The effects of this de facto racial segregation are compounded by the unequal quality of education produced in communities where whites served by former segregation academies seek to minimize tax levies for public schools.

History 

The first segregation academies were created by white parents in the late 1950s in response to the U.S. Supreme Court ruling in Brown v. Board of Education (1954), which required public school boards to eliminate segregation "with all deliberate speed" (Brown II). At the time, segregation under Jim Crow laws was still widely enforced in the South, where most adult blacks were still disfranchised and excluded from politics. The Brown ruling did not apply to private schools, so  founding new academies gave white parents a way to continue to educate their children separately from blacks. In Virginia, the "massive resistance" campaign led Prince Edward County to close its public schools from 1959 to 1964; the only education in the county was a segregation academy, funded by state "tuition grants."

A 1972 report on school desegregation noted that segregation academies could usually be identified by the word "Christian" or "church" in the school's name. The report observed that while individual Protestant churches were often deeply involved in the establishment of segregation academies, Catholic dioceses usually indicated that their schools were not meant to be havens from desegregation. Many segregation academies claimed they were established to provide a "Christian education", but the sociologist Jennifer Dyer has argued that such claims were simply a "guise" for the schools' actual objective of allowing parents to avoid enrolling their children in racially integrated public schools.

Reasons why whites pulled their children out of public schools have been debated: whites insisted that "quality fueled their exodus", and blacks said "white parents refused to allow their children to be schooled alongside blacks". Scholars estimate that, across the nation, at least half a million white students were withdrawn from public schools between 1964 and 1975 to avoid mandatory desegregation. In the 21st century, Archie Douglas, the headmaster of Montgomery Academy (founded as a segregation academy), said that he is sure "that those who resented the Civil Rights Movement or sought to get away from it took refuge in the academy". As of 2014, the student body of The Montgomery Academy was 10% percent non-white.

IRS involvement and definitions
In 1969, parents of Mississippi black children brought suit to revoke tax-exemption status for non-profit segregation academies (Green v. Connally). They won a temporary injunction in the D.C. Circuit  in early 1970 and the suit in June 1971. The United States government appealed to the Supreme Court, where the lower court's decision was summarily affirmed in Coit v. Green (1971).  Meanwhile, on July 10, 1970, the Internal Revenue Service announced it could "no longer legally justify allowing tax-exempt status to private schools which practice racial discrimination." For a school to get or keep its tax-exempt status, it would have to publish a policy of non-discrimination and not practice overt discrimination. Many schools simply refused to comply. In the 1980s, Southern Republican Members of Congress such as Trent Lott and Strom Thurmond began to pressure the Reagan administration to halt revocation of tax-exempt status from segregation academies. In 1982, during congressional debate on the Voting Rights Act Amendments of 1982, the administration considered support for such a policy, leading to what one of its aides called "our worst public-relations and political disaster yet."

A decade later, similarly aggrieved appellees argued once again in Allen v. Wright (1983) that the standards were too low. The appellees had asserted that "there are more than 3,500 racially segregated private academies operating in the country having a total enrollment of more than 750,000 children." The court considered whether the parents had standing to sue, and concluded not, because they did not allege that they or their children had applied to, been discouraged from applying to, or been denied admission to any private school or schools. Specifically, it ruled that citizens do not have standing to sue a federal government agency based on the influence that the agency's determinations might have on third parties (such as private schools). The judges noted the parents were in the posture of disappointed observers of the governmental process.  The IRS would continue to enforce the regulations it had promulgated in 1970. Any school that was not tax-exempt in this period was likely a segregation academy, the standard for non-discrimination being low. Not many of the 3,500 appear in lists, if there were 3,500. After 1983, any school named in a judgement or IRS document in this period absolutely was. Many schools did not regain tax-exempt status until the 1990s.

By state 

Virginia was an early adopter of techniques to establish and finance segregation academies. Virginia was the first state to respond to Brown with the establishment of segregation academies and was also the first to be told in federal court that segregation academies were unconstitutional (Runyon v. McCrary (1976)), leading to their decline. The state was a bellwether for other states. Eventually, five states—Alabama, Georgia, Mississippi, South Carolina and Virginia—defied the court's decision in Brown by 1970.  Segregated private schools lost their tax-exempt status in Coit v. Green (1971). Between 1961 and 1971, non-Catholic Christian schools doubled their enrollments nationally. By 1969, 300,000 of 7,400,000 white students attended segregated school in eleven southern states.

Virginia 
In Virginia, segregation academies were part of a policy of massive resistance declared by U.S. Senator Harry F. Byrd, Sr. He worked to unite other white Virginia politicians and leaders in taking action to prevent school desegregation after the Brown v. Board of Education Supreme Court ruling in 1954.

In its September/October 1956 special session, the Virginia General Assembly passed a series of laws known as the Stanley Plan to implement massive resistance. In January, Virginia's voters had approved an amendment to the state constitution to allow tuition grants to parents enrolling their children in private schools. Part of the Stanley Plan established tuition grants program, which allowed parents who refused to allow their children to attend desegregated schools funding so each could attend a private school of choice. In practice, this meant state support of newly established all-white private schools which became known as "segregation academies".

On February 18, 1958, the General Assembly passed (and Governor Almond signed) additional legislation protecting segregation, what the Byrd Organization called the "Little Rock Bill" (responding to President Eisenhower's use of federal powers to assist the court-ordered desegregation of schools in Little Rock, Arkansas). Since new segregation academy facilities often failed to meet construction, health and safety standards for public schools, these were also loosened.

Segregation academies opened in various Virginia cities and counties subject to desegregation lawsuits, including Arlington, Charlottesville and Norfolk where Governor Almond had ordered the schools closed rather than comply with Federal court orders to desegregate. Arlington and Norfolk desegregated peacefully in February 1959. In Arlington, many (if not most) white students remained in the desegregated schools. However, that was not the case in Norfolk and other areas such as Richmond where whites largely abandoned the public schools for segregation academies and other private schools, home schooling, or moved to predominately white suburbs. Today, more than a half-century after school desegregation, largely due to white flight, the Richmond City and Norfolk Public Schools are the school divisions with the most racially and economically isolated schools in Virginia.

Segregation academies in Warren and Prince Edward Counties and the City of Norfolk are discussed below, as examples of why even in the fall of 1963, only 3,700 black pupils or 1.6% attended school with whites. NAACP litigation had resulted in some desegregation by the fall of 1960 in eleven localities, and the number of at least partially desegregated districts had slowly risen to 20 in the fall of 1961, 29 in the fall of 1962, and 55 (out of 130 school districts) in 1963.

Warren County also planned to integrate its only high school, Warren County High School, but Governor Almond closed the school (along with schools in Charlottesville and Norfolk) in the fall of 1958. Education continued in private and church facilities for that school year. By the fall of 1959, the John S. Mosby Academy (1-12) was constructed and opened as an all-white school. A public high school for black students was built and opened (Criser High School), and Warren County High School reopened with a significantly reduced white student population and 22 black students. Criser operated until 1966, and Mosby operated through the 1968–69 school year.

When faced with an order to integrate, Prince Edward County closed its entire school system in September 1959, and kept county schools closed until 1964, as it kept litigating (although Davis v. County School Board of Prince Edward County had been a companion case to Brown). The newly-founded private Prince Edward Academy operated as the de facto school system for white students. It enrolled K-12 students at several facilities throughout the county. Many black students were forced to move in with relatives in other counties, attend makeshift schools in church basements, or move to northern states to live with host families through a program of the Society of Friends in order to gain education. Even after public schools re-opened, Prince Edward Academy remained segregated as discussed below.

In Norfolk, churches and other organizations offered classes, teachers from the shuttered public schools formed tutorial groups, and classes were also held in private homes. The Norfolk Division of the College of William & Mary (now Old Dominion University) provided classes for some high school students. Other students from Norfolk attended schools in the neighboring cities of Hampton, Chesapeake, Virginia Beach and Portsmouth. Some parents sent their children to live with relatives in other parts of Virginia or in other states. The Defenders of State Sovereignty and Individual Liberties founded the Tidewater Educational Foundation to create a private school for white students in Norfolk. The Tidewater Academy opened as a segregation academy on October 22, 1958, with 250 white students with classes meeting in local churches.

Although on January 19, 1959, the Virginia Supreme Court of Appeals struck down the new Virginia law that closed schools before integration, as contrary to a public schooling provision in the state constitution (and a three-judge federal panel struck down other provisions of the Stanley Plan on the same day, (the Virginia state holiday honoring Robert E. Lee and Stonewall Jackson), individual state tuition grants to parents continued, allowing them to patronize segregation academies.

In 1964, the Supreme Court of the United States ruled in Griffin v. County School Board of Prince Edward County that Virginia's tuition grants where the public schools had been closed for reasons of race (such as in Prince Edward County) violated the U.S. Constitution. This decision finally effectively ended massive resistance within state governments, and dealt some segregation academies a fatal blow. Later rulings put the academies' tax exemption status in jeopardy if they practiced racial discrimination.

In 1978, Prince Edward Academy lost its tax exempt status. In 1986, it changed its admission policy to allow black students to attend but few black students can afford the tuition to attend the school, which today is known as the Fuqua School. All other Virginia segregation academies have either closed, adopted non-racial discrimination policies, or merged with other schools that already had non-discrimination policies in place. Because the Catholic Church had desegregated its schools before Brown, the Huguenot Academy (a segregation academy implicitly disavowing that Catholic policy by its title), merged with Blessed Sacrament High School, a nearby Catholic High School, to become Blessed Sacrament-Huguenot. In 1985 the Bollingbrook School, another private school originally founded as a segregation academy for white students in 1958 merged with a nearby Catholic High School in Petersburg, Gibbons High School, to become St. Vincent de Paul High School.

Most segregation academies founded in Virginia during "Massive Resistance" are still thriving more than a half century later and some like Hampton Roads Academy, the Fuqua School, Nansemond-Suffolk Academy and Isle of Wight Academy continue to expand in the 21st century. Enrollment at Isle of Wight Academy now stands at approximately 650 students, the most ever enrolled at the school. In 2016 Nansemond Suffolk Academy opened a second campus, that includes an additional 22,000 square foot building for students in pre-kindergarten through grade 3. All of these schools had officially adopted non-discrimination policies and begun admitting non-white students by the end of the 1980s and like other private schools, are now eligible for federal education money through what are known as Title programs that flow through public school districts.  However, few blacks can afford the high cost of tuition to send their children to these private schools. In some cases their association with "old money" and past discrimination still cause some tension in the community, especially among non-whites and students of the local public schools. These racist past histories may cause black parents who can afford the tuition to be reluctant to enroll their children in these schools.

The abandonment of public schools by most whites in Virginia's rural counties that lie within the Black Belt and white flight from inner cities to suburbs after the failure of "Massive Resistance" has ultimately led to increasingly racially and economically isolated public schools in Virginia. As of 2016 there were 74,515 students in these isolated schools, including 17 percent of all black students in Virginia’s public schools and 8 percent of all Hispanic students. Many of these schools are inner city schools located in Richmond, Norfolk, Petersburg, Roanoke, and Newport News. By contrast, less than 1 percent of Virginia's non-Hispanic white students attended these isolated schools.,

Mississippi 
 

In Mississippi, many of the segregation academies were first established in the black-majority Mississippi Delta region in northwestern Mississippi. The Delta has historically had a very large majority-black population, related to the history of the use of slave labor on cotton plantations. The potential for integration resulted in white parents' establishing segregation academies in every county in the Delta. Many academies are still operating, from Indianola, Mississippi to Humphreys County. These schools began to accept black students later in the 20th century, although many of them still enroll relatively small numbers of black students. In a region with low incomes among blacks, many African-American parents cannot afford the private schools. At least one school in Mississippi, Carroll Academy, receives substantial funding from the segregationist Council of Conservative Citizens. Mississippi Governor Ross Barnett said in September 1962, "I submit to you tonight, no school will be integrated in Mississippi while I am your governor".

Arkansas 
Between 1966 and 1972, at least 32 segregation academies were established in Arkansas. By 1972, about 5,000 white students attended such schools.

Arkansas is one of twelve states that have not adopted the Blaine Amendment to their state constitutions.  The amendment forbids direct government aid to educational institutions that have a religious affiliation.  Many segregation academies have since adopted curricula with a "Christian world view".

Louisiana
The United States District Court for the Eastern District of Louisiana mandated integration of public schools in Washington Parish (1969) and St. Tammany Parish (1969), and the United States District Court for the Western District of Louisiana did so for Tensas Parish (1970), Claiborne Parish (1970), and Jackson Parish (1969).

Alabama

Alabama, like Mississippi, largely ignored the 1954 ruling of Brown v. Board of Education.  In 1958, a conflict over segregation in city parks brought Martin Luther King Jr. to Montgomery. The city closed its parks; King recommended that black parents attempt to enroll their children in city schools, expecting to establish cases testing the Alabama Pupil Placement Act. Montgomery Academy was the first segregation academy established in Alabama; others followed in the late 1960s.

North Carolina

Following the Brown v. Board of Education decision in 1954, Governor William B. Umstead established a committee to consider the effects of complying the U.S. Supreme Court's ruling. The bi-racial committee made up of blacks and whites reported to the General Assembly that desegregation “throughout the state cannot be accomplished and should not be attempted.” Luther Hodges became governor in 1955, and although opposed to integration, he formed a new committee to study the issue, because the Court had ruled that school desegregation must happen “with all deliberate speed.” When it became clear that the federal government was not going to force the issue, the state began to look for ways to circumvent the Supreme Court, using legal means, while avoiding the outright defiance of court orders that was taking place in Virginia where the legislature had adopted a policy of massive resistance.

This committee established the Pearsall Plan, named after its chairman, Thomas J. Pearsall of Rocky Mount.  In 1956 the Pearsall Plan established a system of local control, freedom of choice, and school vouchers.  The Pearsall Plan also gave school districts the option of shutting down schools by public referendum if they were faced with a desegregation order. The freedom-of-choice system allowed students to attend the school their parents wanted them to attend, and the voucher system allowed parents to use state money to support their child’s education in a private school. As in other southern states a number of private segregation academies were founded.

In 2019 the North Carolina State Board of Education voted unanimously to approve the conversion of Halifax County’s private Hobgood Academy, founded in 1969 as a segregation academy, to a public charter school. Hobgood’s student population is 88 percent white, while only 4 percent of those attending the Halifax County public Schools are white. This had led to concerns by some teachers that while charter schools in some states have helped low-income students improve academically, in North Carolina they have primarily been used as a means for whites to opt out of traditional public schools.

South Carolina
In South Carolina, where private schools have existed since the 1800s, there were no fully racially integrated private schools before 1954. Some 200 private schools were created between 1963 and 1975; private school enrollment hit a peak of 50,000 in 1978. In Clarendon County, for example, the private academy Clarendon Hall was established in late 1965, after four black students enrolled in a previously all-white public school in the fall term. By 1969, only 281 white students were left in the public school system, and only 16 white students were in public schools when they officially desegregated a year later.

Texas
Texas was an early opponent of desegregation. In 1956, blacks were turned away from Mansfield High School in defiance of Brown and other federal orders to integrate. In Dallas, for example, the Dallas Independent School District subdivided itself into six subdistricts, each of which was "one race" (more than ninety percent white or black). The Texas Education Agency was ordered in November 1970 to desegregate Texas public schools (United States v. Texas).  The state did not offer any financial assistance to private schools as Virginia, Mississippi, and Alabama had.

List of schools founded as segregation academies
A partial list of segregation academies includes the following:
{| class="wikitable sortable plainrowheaders" width=40%
!scope="col" width=40%| School
!scope="col" width=25%| State
!scope="col" width=5%| 
!scope="col" width=2% class="unsortable" | 

|-
!scope="row"| Abbeville Christian Academy
|Alabama
|1970
|
|-

!scope="row"| Autauga Academy
|Alabama
|1969
|
|-

!scope="row"| Bessemer Academy
|Alabama
|1969
|
|-

!scope="row"| Central Alabama Academy
|Alabama
|1970
|
|-
!scope="row"|Chambers Academy
|Alabama
|1969
|

|-
!scope="row"| Clarke Preparatory School
|Alabama
|1970
|

|-
!scope="row"| Coosa Valley Academy
|Alabama
|1972
|
|-
!scope="row"|Dixie Academy
|Alabama
|1967
|
|-

!scope="row"|Edgewood Academy
|Alabama
|1967
|
|-

!scope="row"| Escambia Academy
|Alabama
|1970
|
|-
!scope="row"| Eclectic Academy
|Alabama
|1972
|
|-
!scope="row"|Grove Hill Academy
|Alabama
|1970
|
|-

!scope="row"| Houston Academy
|Alabama
|1970
|
|-

!scope="row"| Indian Springs School
|Alabama
|1952
|
|-

!scope="row"| Inglenook Academy
|Alabama
|1970
|
|-

!scope="row"| John T. Morgan Academy
|Alabama
|1965
|
|-
!scope="row"| Lowndes Academy
|Alabama
|1966
|
|-
!scope="row"|Macon East Academy
|Alabama
|1963
|

|-
!scope="row"| Monroe Academy
|Alabama
|1969
|
|-
!scope="row"| Montgomery Academy
|Alabama
|1959
|

|-
!scope="row"| Pickens Academy
|Alabama
|1969
|

|-
!scope="row"| Saint James School
|Alabama
|1955
|

|-
!scope="row"| South Choctaw Academy
|Alabama
|1969
|

|-
!scope="row"| Springwood School
|Alabama
|1970
|

|-
!scope="row"| Sumter Academy
|Alabama
|1970 closed 2017
|

|-
!scope="row"| Trinity Presbyterian School
|Alabama
|1970
|

|-
!scope="row"| Tuscaloosa Academy
|Alabama
|1967
|
|-
!scope="row"| Wilcox Academy
|Alabama
|1970
|
|-

!scope="row"| Bellaire Academy
|Arkansas
|1970
|
|-

!scope="row"| Central Arkansas Christian School
|Arkansas
|1970
|
|-
!scope="row"| Central Baptist Academy
|Arkansas
|1970
|
|-

!scope="row"| Edgewood Academy
|Arkansas
|1970
|
|-
!scope="row"| England Academy
|Arkansas
|1970
|
|-

!scope="row"| Hughes Academy
|Arkansas
|1971
|
|-
!scope="row"| Jefferson Preparatory Academy
|Arkansas
|1971
|
|-
!scope="row"| Marvell Academy
|Arkansas
|1966
|
|-
!scope="row"| Montrose Academy
|Arkansas
|1970
|
|-

!scope="row"| Pulaski Academy
|Arkansas
|1971
|
|-

!scope="row"| Southeast Academy
|Arkansas
|1970
|
|-

!scope="row"| Tabernacle Baptist Academy
|Arkansas
|1970
|
|-
!scope="row"| Watson Chapel Academy
|Arkansas
|1971
|
|-
!scope="row"| West Memphis Christian School
|Arkansas
|1970
|
|-
!scope="row"| Bayshore Christian School
|Florida
|1971
|
|-
!scope="row"| Dade Christian School
|Florida
|1961
|
|-
!scope="row"| Glades Day School
|Florida
|1965
|
|-
!scope="row"| Lake Highland Preparatory School
|Florida
|1970
|
|-
!scope="row"| Maclay School
|Florida
|1968
|
|-
!scope="row"| Oak Hall School
|Florida
|1970
|
|-
!scope="row"| Robert F. Munroe Day School
|Florida
|1969
|
|-

!scope="row"| Rolling Green Academy
|Florida
|1970
|
|-

!scope="row"| North Florida Christian School
|Florida
|1968
|
|-
!scope="row"| Tallavana Christian School
|Florida
|1971
|
|-
!scope="row"| University Christian School
|Florida
|1970
|
|-
!scope="row"| Bulloch Academy
| Georgia
|1971
|
|-

!scope="row"| Flint River Academy
| Georgia
|1967
|
|-

!scope="row"| George Walton Academy
| Georgia
|1969
|
|-
!scope="row"|Gordon Ivey Independent High School
|Georgia
|1970
|
|-
!scope="row"| John Hancock Academy
|Georgia
|1966
|
|-

!scope="row"| Nathanael Greene Academy
| Georgia
|1969
|
|-
!scope="row"| Valwood School
|Georgia
|1969
| 
|-
!scope="row"| Savannah Country Day
|Georgia
|1955
|
|-
!scope="row"| Southland Academy
|Georgia
|1967
|
|-
!scope="row"| Southwest Georgia Academy
|Georgia
|1970
|
|-
!scope="row"|The Westfield School
|Georgia
|1970
|
|-
!scope="row"| Pinewood Christian Academy
|Georgia
|1970
|
|-

!scope="row"| Bowling Green School
|Louisiana
|1970
|
|-
!scope="row"| Briarfield Academy
|Louisiana
|1970
|
|-

!scope="row"| Caddo Community School
|Louisiana
|1969
|
|-
!scope="row"|Central Private School
|Louisiana
|1971
|
|-

!scope="row"| Claiborne Academy
|Louisiana
|1969
||
|-
!scope="row"| False River Academy
|Louisiana
|1969
|
|-
!scope="row"| Glenbrook School
|Louisiana
|1966
|
|-
!scope="row"| Grawood Christian School
|Louisiana
|1966
|
|-
!scope="row"| Guy Beuche
|Louisiana
|1969
|
|-
!scope="row"| LeJeune Academy
|Louisiana
|1969
|
|-
!scope="row"| Livonia Academy
|Louisiana
|1969
|
|-
!scope="row"| River Oaks School
|Louisiana
|1969
|
|-
!scope="row"| Old River Academy
|Louisiana
|1969
|
|-
!scope="row"| West End Academy
|Louisiana
|1969
|
|-
!scope="row"| Prytania Private School
|Louisiana
|1960
|
|-
!scope="row"| Tenth Ward Private School
|Louisiana
|1969
|
|-
!scope="row"| Adams County Christian School
|Mississippi
|1964
|
|-
!scope="row"|Amite Center School
|Mississippi
|1968
|
|-

!scope="row"| Bayou Academy
|Mississippi
|1964
|
|-
!scope="row"| Benton Academy
|Mississippi
|1969
|
|-
!scope="row"| Brandon Academy
|Mississippi
|1968
closed 1989
|
|-
!scope="row"| Brookhaven Academy
|Mississippi
|1970
|
|-
!scope="row"| Calhoun Academy
|Mississippi
|1968
|
|-
!scope="row"| Canton Academy
|Mississippi
|1965
|<ref name="coffey">Coffey v. State Educational Finance Commission  296 F. Supp. 1389 (S.D. Miss. 1969) </ref>
|-
!scope="row"| Carroll Academy
|Mississippi
|1969
|
|-
!scope="row"| Central Academy
|Mississippi
|1969
closed 2017
|
|-
!scope="row"| Central Delta Academy
|Mississippi
|c 1969closed 2010
|
|-
!scope="row"| Centreville Academy
|Mississippi
|1967
|
|-

!scope="row"| Central Holmes Academy
|Mississippi
|1967
|
|-

!scope="row"| Copiah Academy
|Mississippi 
|1967
|
|-
!scope="row"|Cruger-Tchula Academy
|Mississippi
|1965
|
|-
!scope="row"| Council Manhattan High School
|Mississippi
|1966
|
|-
!scope="row"| Deer Creek Academy
|Mississippi
|1970
|
|-
!scope="row"| Delta Academy
|Mississippi
|1964
|
|-
!scope="row"|East Holmes Academy
|Mississippi
|1964Closed 2006
|
|-
!scope="row"| East Rankin Academy
|Mississippi
|1970
|
|-

!scope="row"| Greenville Christian School
|Mississippi
|1969
|
|-

!scope="row"| Hillcrest Christian School
|Mississippi
|1965
|
|-
!scope="row"| Indianola Academy
|Mississippi
|1965
|
|-
!scope="row"| Heidelberg Academy
|Mississippi
|1970
|
|-

!scope="row"| Heritage Academy
|Mississippi
|1964
|
|-
!scope="row"| Humphreys Academy
|Mississippi
|1968
|
|-
!scope="row"| Jackson Academy
|Mississippi
|1959
|
|-
!scope="row"| Jackson Preparatory School
|Mississippi
|1970
|
|-

!scope="row"| Jefferson Davis Academy
|Mississippi
|1969
|
|-
!scope="row"| Kirk Academy
|Mississippi
|1966
|
|-
!scope="row"| Lamar School
|Mississippi
|1964
|
|-
!scope="row"| Lawrence County Academy
|Mississippi
|1970
|
|-

!scope="row"| Lee Academy
|Mississippi
|1970
|
|-

!scope="row"| Leake Academy
|Mississippi
|1970
|
|-
!scope="row"| Leland Academy 
||Mississippi
|1969
|
|-
!scope="row"| Madison-Ridgeland Academy
|Mississippi
|1969
|
|-

!scope="row"|Magnolia Heights
|Mississippi
|1970
|
|-

!scope="row"|Manchester Academy
|Mississippi
|1969
|
|-
!scope="row"| Marshall Academy
|Mississippi
|1968
|
|-
!scope="row"| McCluer Academy
|Mississippi
|1970
|
|-

!scope="row"| Northpoint Christian School
|Mississippi
|1973
|
|-

!scope="row"| North Sunflower Academy
|Mississippi
|1969
|
|-

!scope="row"| Oak Hill Academy (Mississippi)
|Mississippi
|1966
|
|-
!scope="row"| Parklane Academy
|Mississippi
|1970
|
|-
!scope="row"| Pillow Academy
|Mississippi
|1966
|
|-
!scope="row"| Sharkey-Issaquena Academy
|Mississippi
|1970
|
|-

!scope="row"| St. George's Episcopal Day School
|Mississippi
|
|
|-

!scope="row"| Starkville Academy
|Mississippi
|1969
|
|-
!scope="row"| Strider Academy
|Mississippi
|1971closed 2018
|
|-
!scope="row"| Tri-County Academy
|Mississippi
|1970
|
|-
!scope="row"| Tunica Institute of Learning
|Mississippi
|1964
|
|-
!scope="row"| Walthall Academy
|Mississippi
|1969
|
|-

!scope="row"| Washington School
|Mississippi
|1969
|

|-
!scope="row"| Wilkinson County Christian Academy
|Mississippi
|1969
|

|-
!scope="row"| Winona Christian School
|Mississippi
|1970
|

|-
!scope="row"| Winston Academy
|Mississippi
|1969
|
|-
!scope="row"| Woodland Hills Academy
|Mississippi
|1970
closed
|
|-
!scope="row"| Arendell Parrott Academy
|North Carolina
|1964
|
|-
!scope="row"| Cape Fear Academy
|North Carolina
|1968
|
|-

!scope="row"| Forsyth Country Day School
|North Carolina
|1970
|
|-

!scope="row"| Lawrence Academy
|North Carolina
|1968
|
|-

!scope="row"| Northside Christian Academy
|North Carolina
|1961
|
|-

!scope="row"| Providence Day School
|North Carolina
|1970
|
|-

!scope="row"| Rocky Mount Academy
|North Carolina
|1968
|
|-

!scope="row"| Wake Christian Academy
|North Carolina
|1966
|
|-

!scope="row"| Christian Heritage Academy
|Oklahoma
|1972
|
|-
!scope="row"| Bowman Academy
|South Carolina
|1966
|
|-
!scope="row"| Clarendon Hall Academy
|South Carolina
|1965
|
|-
!scope="row"| Calhoun Academy
|South Carolina
|1969
|
|-
!scope="row"| Hilton Head Preparatory School
|South Carolina
|1985
|
|-
!scope="row"| Jefferson Davis Academy
|South Carolina
|1965
|
|-
!scope="row"| John C. Calhoun Academy
|South Carolina
|1966
|
|-
!scope="row"| Hammond School
|South Carolina
|1966
|
|-
!scope="row"| Thomas Heyward Academy
|South Carolina
|1970
|
|-
!scope="row"| Richard Winn Academy
|South Carolina
|1966
|
|-
!scope="row"| Roy Hudgens Academy
|South Carolina
|1966
|
|-
!scope="row"| Sea Island Academy
|South Carolina
|1970
|
|-
!scope="row"| Wade Hampton Academy
|South Carolina
|1964
|
|-
!scope="row"| Wilson Hall
|South Carolina
|1967
|

|-
!scope="row"| Willington Academy
|South Carolina
|1970
|

|-
!scope="row"| Coastal Academy
|South Carolina
|1970
|
|-
!scope="row"| Stonewall Jackson Academy (Orangeburg)
|South Carolina
|1965
|
|-
!scope="row"| Williamsburg Academy
|South Carolina
|1970
|
|-
!scope="row"| Robert E. Lee Academy
|South Carolina
|1965
|
|-
!scope="row"| Brentwood Academy
|Tennessee
|1969
|
|-
!scope="row"| Briarcrest Baptist High School
|Tennessee
|1973
|
|-
!scope="row"| Evangelical Christian School
|Tennessee
|1965
|
|-
!scope="row"| Franklin Road Academy
|Tennessee
|1971
|
|-
!scope="row"| Harding Academy (Nashville)
|Tennessee
|1971
|
|-
!scope="row"| Lakehill Preparatory School
|Texas
|1971
|
|-
!scope="row"| Northwest Academy
|Texas
|1970
|
|-
!scope="row"| Trinity Christian Academy
|Texas
|1970
| 
|-
!scope="row"| Amelia Academy
|Virginia
|1964
|
|-
!scope="row"| Bobbe's School
|Virginia
|1958
|
|-
!scope="row"| Bollingbrook School
|Virginia
|1958
|
|-
!scope="row"| Broadwater Academy
|Virginia
|1966
|
|-
!scope="row"| Brunswick Academy
|Virginia
|1964
|
|-
!scope="row"| Carlisle School
|Virginia
|1968
|
|-
!scope="row"| Fairfax-Brewster School
|Virginia
|1955
|
|-
!scope="row"| Prince Edward Academy
|Virginia
|1959
|
|-
!scope="row"| Hampton Roads Academy
|Virginia
|1959
|
|-
!scope="row"| Huguenot Academy
|Virginia
|1959
| 
|-
!scope="row"| Isle of Wight Academy
|Virginia
|1967
|
|-
!scope="row"| Jamestown Academy
|Virginia
|1964
|
|-
!scope="row"| John S. Mosby Academy
|Virginia
|1959
|
|-
!scope="row"| Lynchburg Christian Academy
|Virginia
|1967
|
|-
!scope="row"| Nansemond-Suffolk Academy
|Virginia
|1966
|
|-
!scope="row"| Robert E. Lee Academy
|Virginia
|1959
|
|-
!scope="row"| Rock Hill Academy
|Virginia
|1959
|
|-
!scope="row"| Southampton Academy
|Virginia
|1969
|
|-
!scope="row"| Tidewater Academy (Wakefield)
|Virginia
|1964
|
|-
!scope="row"| Tidewater Academy (Norfolk) 
|Virginia
|1958
|
|-
!scope="row"| Tomahawk Academy
|Virginia
|1964
|
|-
!scope="row"|Surry Academy
|Virginia
|1963
|
|-
|-
!scope="row"| York Academy
|Virginia
|1965
|
|-
|}

In federal lawGreen v. Connally (1971) set the standard by which the Internal Revenue Service identifies a segregation academy, a so-called "Paragraph (1) School".  The IRS must deny exemption to schools:

which have been determined in adversary or administrative proceedings to be racially discriminatory; or were established or expanded at or about the time the public school districts in which they are located or which they serve were desegregating, and which cannot demonstrate that they do not racially discriminate in admissions, employment, scholarships, loan programs, athletics, and extracurricular programs.

See also

 The "Southern Manifesto", a document written in 1956 by legislators in the United States Congress opposed to racial integration in public places
 Runyon v. McCrary (1976): U.S. Supreme Court affirms private schools may not discriminate due to race based on 42 U.S.C. 1981.
 Allen v. Wright, a 1984 U. S. Supreme Court case challenging public subsidy for private schools that are effectively segregated.

Further reading
 Felton, Emmanuel, "The Secessionist Movement in Education," The Nation, Sept. 25, 2017, pp. 12–24.
 Rooks, Noliwe, "Cindy Hyde-Smith Is Teaching Us What Segregation Academies Taught Her," New York Times,'' Nov. 28, 2018.

References

External links
"The Ground Beneath Our Feet" website
Massive Resistance timeline

"They Closed Our Schools," the story of Massive Resistance and the closing of the Prince Edward County, Virginia public schools
Edward H. Peeples Prince Edward County (Va.) Public Schools Collection photographs, documents, and maps exploring the history of the Prince Edward County school segregation issues of the 1950s and 1960s, from the collection of the VCU Libraries.

History of Virginia
History of Arkansas
History of Mississippi
School segregation in the United States
African-American history of Virginia
African-American history of Arkansas
African-American history of Mississippi
Civil rights movement
 
Mississippi education-related lists